The Rally for the People of Burundi is a political party in Burundi. It was headed by Ernest Kabushemeye, until his assassination in 1995, since when Balthazar Bigirimana has been party leader.

History
The RPB was registered on 12 August 1992. It supported victorious candidate Melchior Ndadaye of the Front for Democracy in Burundi in the 1993 presidential elections. In the 1993 parliamentary elections it received 1.7% of the vote, failing to win a seat.

References

Political parties in Burundi
Political parties established in 1992
1992 establishments in Burundi